The 2004 Country Music Association Awards, 38th Ceremony, on November 9, 2004, hosted by CMA Award Winning duo, Brooks & Dunn. This was the final ceremony to be held in the Grand Ole Opry House in Nashville, Tennessee. 

Alan Jackson led with seven nominations, including Album of the Year, and Entertainer of the Year.

Winners and Nominees

References 

Country Music Association
CMA
Country Music Association Awards
Country Music Association Awards
Country Music Association Awards
Country Music Association Awards
21st century in Nashville, Tennessee
Events in Nashville, Tennessee